Saddle stitch staplers or simply saddle staplers are bookbinding tools designed to insert staples into the spine (saddle) of folded printed matter such as booklets, catalogues, brochures, and manuals. They are distinguished by their unusual length (most traditional staplers are too short to staple booklets easily) and by the presence of a V-shaped hump or "saddle" which is used to precisely align the central fold of the material to be stapled.

A saddle stapler may also be used to staple fabric or other flexible material, as the material is bunched up inside the throat in order to reach the seam to be stapled. Most high-end photocopiers and digital production printers on the market have optional attached saddle stitch units that fold and staple booklets automatically.

References

Book publishing